Massachusetts House of Representatives' 8th Norfolk district in the United States is one of 160 legislative districts included in the lower house of the Massachusetts General Court. It covers parts of Bristol County and Norfolk County. Democrat Lou Kafka of Stoughton has represented the district since 1991. Candidates running for this district seat in the 2020 Massachusetts general election include Andrew Flowers.

Towns represented
The district includes the following localities:
 part of Mansfield
 Sharon
 part of Stoughton
 part of Walpole

The current district geographic boundary overlaps with those of the Massachusetts Senate's Bristol and Norfolk district and Norfolk, Bristol and Plymouth district.

Former locales
The district previously covered:
 Norwood, circa 1927 
 Weymouth, circa 1872

Representatives
 Lot W. Bicknell, circa 1858 
 Nathaniel Shaw, circa 1858 
 Elias S. Beals, circa 1859 
 Daniel Lovell, circa 1859 
 Charles W. Seavey, circa 1888 
 Elijah Baron Stowe, circa 1888 
 Frederic W. Kingman, circa 1920 
 Frank D. McCarthy, circa 1951 
 Andrew H. Card, Jr., circa 1975 
 William Richard Keating, 1979–1985
 Marjorie Clapprood, 1985–1991
 Louis L. Kafka, 1991-2020
Ted Philips, 2020–present

See also
 List of Massachusetts House of Representatives elections
 Other Norfolk County districts of the Massachusetts House of Representatives: 1st, 2nd, 3rd, 4th, 5th, 6th, 7th,  9th, 10th, 11th, 12th, 13th, 14th, 15th
 List of Massachusetts General Courts
 List of former districts of the Massachusetts House of Representatives

Images

References

Further reading

External links
 Ballotpedia
  (State House district information based on U.S. Census Bureau's American Community Survey).
 League of Women Voters of Sharon-Stoughton
 League of Women Voters of Westwood-Walpole-Dedham

House
Government of Norfolk County, Massachusetts
Government of Bristol County, Massachusetts